Caughey is a surname. Notable people with the surname include:

Catherine Caughey (née Harvey, 1923–2008), Colossus computer operator at Bletchley Park during World War II
Christine Caughey, former City Councillor in Auckland City, New Zealand, for the Action Hobson ticket
Mark Caughey (born 1960), former Northern Irish association football striker
Seán Caughey (died 2010), Northern Ireland politician

See also
Caughey Western History Association Prize, given annually to the best book published the previous year on the American West
Smith & Caughey's, mid-sized department store chain in New Zealand
Thomas K. Caughey Dynamics Award, award given annually by the Applied Mechanics Division, of American Society of Mechanical Engineers (ASME)